Coronado High School is a public high school in Henderson, Nevada, part of Clark County School District.

History
The school was named after Francisco Vásquez de Coronado, a Spanish conquistador. It opened in 2000, with Monte Bay as its first principal. In 2005 Bay was selected as Nevada's Principal of the Year by the National Association of Secondary School Principals.

Extracurricular activities

Clubs
There are more than fifty activities that a student can participate in at Coronado. Among them are Spanish and French clubs, Key Club, NHS, and AP Club.

Color Guard/Winter Guard
The Coronado Color Guard marches alongside the Coronado Cougar Pride Marching Band during the fall and participates in the WGASC (Winter Guard Association of Southern California) for Indoor Season from December to April.

Varsity Quiz
Coronado's Varsity Quiz team has been a state playoff team each year since 2004, and they won their first State Championship in 2008. The same year, they became the first team in Nevada to compete in the National Academic Quiz Tournaments' High School Championships. The team also won the State Championship in 2016.

Robotics
The Coronado Computer/Robotics Club participates in the annual FIRST Robotics Competition. They received a participation grant from NASA for their "Rockin Robots" project in 2009/10.

Theatre
The Coronado Theatre Department puts on two mainstage productions per year: a fall play and a spring musical. Other annual productions include a musical theatre revue for charity, a student-directed short play festival, theatre awards night and occasionally, a summer musical. Notable productions include Into the Woods (2006), Disney's Beauty and the Beast (2013), the state-adjudicated production of Legally Blonde the Musical (2019), Les Misèrables (2020), and the state-adjudicated production of Mamma Mia! (2023). The theatre department also takes a biennial trip to New York City.

Choir
The Coronado Choir has performed in cities such as Anaheim, Chicago, Honolulu, and Flagstaff. They performed in Carnegie Hall in New York City in the spring of 2016. The department features six official groups, including Madrigals, Bella Voce, Glee Club, Concert Choir, and a men's and women's barbershop.

Athletics

Lacrosse
The boys lacrosse team won the State Championship in 2005.

The girls team won the state championship in 2006, 2007, and 2019.

Bowling team
The boys team won the Nevada Interscholastic Activities Association state championship in 2004, 2005, 2010, and 2015. while the girls team won 2006, 2007, and 2008.

Volleyball
Coronado High School's boys volleyball program has made ten state tournament appearances between 2004 and 2017, including four regional championships (2008, 2009, 2011, 2013), three state runners up (2009, 2010, 2011), and back-to-back state championships in 2012 and 2013.

Coronado High School's girls volleyball program has made six state tournament appearances between 2003 and 2017, including six regional titles (2003, 2005, 2013, 2014, 2015, 2017), one state runner up finish (2003), and a state championship "three-peat" with three state championship titles in 2013, 2014, and 2015.

Tennis team
The women's team won the Nevada 4A State Title in 2003, 2017, and 2018.

Baseball Team

The 2014 boys' varsity baseball team won the Division 1 Nevada state championship.

Coronado Cougar Pride Marching Band

Coronado's band has 130 members. The band made finals at the 2006 Bands of America performance at Northern Arizona University as well as the 2009 Bands of America performance at St. George, Utah, at the time only the fourth school to do so in the history of Clark County School District. The band has traveled to San Diego, California, and London, England to march in the New Year's Day Parade, to Washington D.C. to perform in the National Cherry Blossom Festival and Independence Day Parade, and to Dublin, Ireland, for the St. Patrick's Day parade, and to Cleveland, Ohio, to perform at The Rock and Roll Hall of Fame.

Academics
Many different AP classes are offered to students, ranging from Computer Science to U.S. History and Chemistry to Psychology.

Feeder schools
Neil C. Twitchell Elementary School (2001)
John C. Vanderburg Elementary School (1997)
Glen C. Taylor Elementary School (2003)
Elise L. Wolff Elementary School (2001)
Frank Lamping Elementary School (1998)
David M. Cox Elementary School (1990)
Selma F. Bartlett Elementary School (1992)
Bob Miller Middle School (1999)
Del E. Webb Middle School (2005)
Barbara & Hank Greenspun Junior High School (1991)

References

External links

Buildings and structures in Henderson, Nevada
Clark County School District
Education in Henderson, Nevada
Educational institutions established in 2000
2000 establishments in Nevada
High schools in Clark County, Nevada
Public high schools in Nevada

es:Coronado High School